...And Jesus Moonwalks the Mississippi is a 2004 play by Marcus Gardley. The play is a re-imagining of the Greek myth of Persephone and Demeter.

Plot 

...And Jesus Moonwalks the Mississippi is set on the banks of the Mississippi River during the Civil War. A lynched African-American man named Damascus is immediately resurrected as a woman named Demeter, who only has three days to find her daughter Po'em and transmit her song before she has to return to death.

Characters

The Quilter 

 Miss Ssippi is a beautifully large, black woman. She gives new meaning to the word elegance, although she appears over-worked and always on the run.

The Threads 

 Free Girl is ten, half black and half white. Her face is caked in white powder and her hair is always tied up. She wears a tea dress.
 Blanche Verse or Blanchie is also ten and white. She wears short pants and an old army vest, which hangs loosely on her.
 Cadence Marie Verse is Blanche's mother. She is white and old enough to be embarrassed by her age. She is always dolled up: blush on the cheeks, rouge on the lips and gin on the tongue.
 Jean Verse is a thin, white romantic. He wears a white silk shirt, Confederate slacks and a dark fedora. His voice is like the wind; it caters to the trees.
 Demeter is old enough to die wise. She is black, with silver her hair and smooth skin. She is built like a good man, one who's been fighting all her life. She wears a tattered petticoat, ripped slacks and a headscarf. Damascus is her former being.
 Yankee Pot Roast is juicy, with much fat hanging off him. He is white and red all over.
 Jesus is black, a warm beauty. He wears sandals and a robe. The actor that plays him also plays The Great Tree.
 Brer Rabit is the House Negro.

Influence 
The play is based on the story of Persephone and her mother, the goddess of the harvest Demeter.

References 

2010 plays
African-American plays
Plays set in the 19th century